Philip O'Sullivan is an Irish actor with contributions to Irish arts and culture through his roles and performances in theatre, on film and on television. O'Sullivan has been involved with the Abbey Theatre Ireland since the 1970s. In 1975 he appeared in an Abbey Theatre production of a play by Irish playwright Teresa Deevy called Katie Roche  where he played the part of Michael Maguire, this production ran for 21 performances.

O'Sullivan is also known for voice acting roles and his character driven distinguishable voice forms the sound track for many advertisements.

Early life. 
Irish actor Philip (Thomas John) O'Sullivan was born in Dublin on the 4th of April 1956, one of nine children born to Marie (née Stanford) O'Sullivan and John F (Jack) O'Sullivan, consultant surgeon at The Mater Hospital. His father died the following year, aged forty-two.

He attended primary and secondary education at Terenure College Dublin. Although renowned for its rugby prowess, it also had a thriving theatre tradition and Philip appeared in a wide variety of roles while there. Pre voice-breaking parts included Soothsayer in Julius Caesar, Duchess of York in Richard III and Maisie Madigan in Juno and the Paycock, followed by McLoghlain "The Curate" in Joseph Tomelty's Is the Priest at Home and Seamus Sheilds in The Shadow of a Gunman.  He was also active in the local drama society, directing and appearing in The Merchant of Venice, Macbeth and A Man for All Seasons.

Career to now. 

In his final year at Terenure College (1973) he was spotted by Joe Dowling playing Donald in a production of Simon Gray's Spoiled at The Project Arts Centre. This led to an offer to join The Young Abbey Theatre Group, a theatre in education element of The Abbey at that time. A year later he was offered a contract with the Abbey Theatre Company, Ireland's National Theatre, one of the youngest actors ever to receive a Players contract   He appeared in numerous plays on both The Abbey and Peacock stages during his first contract. The Vicar of Wakefield, Ulysees in Nighttown, Oedipus, Mrs. Warren's Profession, All You Need is Love, Three Sisters, Sanctified Distances, Purgatory, Find the Lady, Blood Wedding, Katie Roche, Stephen D and The Life and Times of Benvenuto Cellini being just some.

From 1979 to 1981, he went freelance, pursuing TV/ Film work and also independent theatre opportunities. In this time, he worked with The Irish Theatre Company (principally touring Ben Traver's A Cuckoo in the Nest). He played David Charters in SOS Titanic (EMI Films) and made two major TV series for RTE, The Burke Enigma , the station's first all film/location TV crime/detective drama produced and directed by the award-winning Brian Mac Lochlainn and Seán, a thirteen hour drama series on the early life of Sean O'Casey, produced and directed by Louis Lentin. He also starred as Artie in RTE's television adaptation of Teresa's Wedding by William Trevor, directed by Donal Farmer. Theatre appearances included Billy Bibbit in a star-studded cast including Liam Neeson, John Kavanagh, Ray McAnally, Joan O'Hara and Tom Hickey in One Flew Over The Cuckoo's Nest (Noel Pearson Productions), Simon Bliss in Hay Fever, John Brown in Robin Glendinning's Jennifer's Vacation (Gate Theatre), Romeo in Romeo and Juliet (Louis O'Sullivan Productions) and Alistair Spenlow in Move Over Mrs. Markham (Oscar Theatre).

On his return under contract to The Abbey ('81/'83), a time he referred to in a radio interview as "The Happy Time", he was involved in several new plays as well as the more traditional Abbey cannon. Plays and musicals included Mary Makebelieve,The Lugnaquilla Gorilla, Hamlet, The Plough and the Stars, The Hidden Curriculum, Childish Things, Fiche Blían á Fás, Petty Sessions, The Merchant of Venice, The Glass Menagerie and The Silver Dollar Boys.

He left the Abbey in late 1983 with a performance/production record totalling well over fifty plays, nineteen of which were world premieres and four were musicals. Also in '83 he worked again for RTE playing Sweeney in Eagles and Trumpets (directed by Deirdre Friel) and for Mobile Showcase Theatre (TV) USA, as Tarquin in A Careful Man by Frederick Forsythe. In early 1984 he was one of the founder members of Smock Alley Theatre Company, an avant-garde (and Arts Council funded) actor-collective, working without any theatre directors, focusing mainly on reworking neglected classics. The Company was also designed to tour Ireland extensively, replacing the gap left by the, by now, defunct Irish Theatre Company. The Players and the set/lighting/wardrobe essentials travelled in a van/minibus, with all the technical responsibilities shared by the actors. Smock Alley's first production was Congreve's Love for Love, with O'Sullivan taking the role of Valentine.

In this same year he had an offer from RTE's Brian Mac Lochlainn to play, over a three season period ('84/85/86), a principal character (Fr.Michael) in the new TV sit-com Leave it to Mrs. O'Brien.   There continued appearances at The Abbey and The Peacock, Manus in The Hard Life by Flann O'Brien (1986) and Dave in Neil Donnelly's Goodbye Carraroe in 1989.  It would be in 2007 when he would next appear at Ireland's National Theatre.

Since the 90's and 2000's he has continued to work on many films, TV dramas, plays and an extensive recording portfolio. Television/Film appearances included five years as Fr.Tracey in RTE's flagship Sunday night drama Glenroe ('97/'98/'99/2000/2001). Also Veronica Guerin, The American, The Return and Studs with guest appearances in Anytime Now, Fair City, Foreign Bodies, and Showbands 1 and 2. At The Gate he appeared as Stryver KC in A Tale of Two Cities, Mr. Boon in You Never Can Tell, Mr.Dunby in Lady Windemere's Fan, Clitandre in The Misanthrope and Cléante in Tartuffe. At The Focus Theatre he played Harry in Albee's A Delicate Balance, The Father in Jennifer Johnston's How Many Miles to Babylon (Second Age) and Gerard in Rodney Lee's The Gist Of It, for Fishamble Theatre Company.  At The Abbey, there were two appearances in 2007 and 2008, Rev. Brown in Lennox Robinson's The Big House directed by Conall Morrison and as Clark in The Resistible Rise of Arturo Ui by Berthold Brecht, directed by Jimmy Fay.

In 2004 he was engaged by Ouroboros Theatre Company as Baron van Sweeten in Amadeus, which subsequently led on to him playing Peter Lombard in Geoff Gould's production of Brian Friel's Making History (2006/7) under Artistic Director Denis Conway. This was a record breaking production that opened in The Samuel Beckett Theatre Dublin and then played all over Ireland in various site-specific venues that were made available by The Office of Public Works (OPW) and in 2007, the 400th anniversary year of The Flight of The Earls, the production also toured to several cities in France and Switzerland following the route of O'Neill's trek across Europe and finally to Rome, where O'Neill had died in exile. Ouroboros were subsequently invited to perform the play for Brian Friel at the celebrations for his eightieth birthday at the Magill Summer School, Glenties Co. Donegal in July 2009.  Ouroboros and O'Sullivan were also involved in many other theatrical tributes to Friel, notably in Paris, where Brian Friel was honoured at The Irish Cultural Centre on the Rue des Irelandais.

In 2005, he was asked to play Ross Tuttle in Edward Albee's highly controversial play The Goat, or who is Sylvia? for the then recently formed and very innovative Landmark Productions under its Director and founder Anne Clarke. This began an association with Landmark that lasts to this day. In 2006, Landmark produced Glen Berger's acclaimed one-actor play Underneath The Lintel with O'Sullivan playing the obsessional Dutch librarian in search of "The Wandering Jew". The play premiered initially at The Dublin Fringe Festival (Project Arts Centre) receiving rave reviews and there were subsequent productions at The Helix and Andrew's Lane Theatre (2007) followed by a nation-wide tour. In 2010, Landmark presented the play at The Edinburgh Festival, where it and its performer received five-star receptions from Libby Purvis of The Times, amongst many others. Also in 2007, Landmark produced the huge hit The Last Days of the Celtic Tiger (Olympia Theatre) by Paul Howard, a savagely funny satire on Ireland's 'get rich quick' years leading up to "The Crash" of 2008. Philip O'Sullivan played Charles O'Carroll Kelly, the corrupt, ruthless father of the play's rugby-glory days fantasist and narcissistic anti-hero Ross. Paul Howard wrote and Landmark produced two further Ross satires, Between Foxrock And A Hard Place (2010/2011, Olympia/Gaiety Dublin/ Cork Opera House) and in 2014/15 Breaking Dad (Gaiety/Cork/Limerick) with O'Sullivan reprising his role as Charles. All three plays were directed by Jimmy Fay and were phenomenally popular with the public.

In 2013 he began filming on Vikings as the recurring character Bishop Edmund, advisor to King Ekbert, played by his great friend Linus Roache. By the time Edmund was finally murdered in Season 4 (aired in February 2017) Philip had appeared in three Seasons of the series and countless episodes. It was the second time that he had played a "High Priest" for Octagon Films, having played The Archbishop of Canterbury, Wareham, in The Tudors in 2007/8.

In 2016, Jimmy Fay, Artistic Director of the Lyric Theatre Belfast, commissioned Philip to adapt Shaw's St. Joan for The Lyric's Autumn Season of that year. The brief was to make Shaw's original script viable in today's economic and resource challenged times. Shaw's play has a speaking cast of 22 characters and a running time (with epilogue) of well over four hours. The result was an adaptation using seven actors and a playing time of two hours (excluding interval). See Programme note and reviews. A critical success when it opened in September 2016 but sadly not a commercial one. But as the copyright on Shaw's plays runs out at the end of 2020, there has been interest from theatres in the US and Australia looking to use this particularly versatile version of Shaw's compelling masterpiece. Also, while in Belfast, Philip guested in an Episode of Game of Thrones as a Citadel Maestor.

Towards the end of 2016, he was cast in Mel Gibson's film The Professor and The Madman, as the prosecuting Queen's Counsel to Sean Penn's accused and mad Dr. Minor.

In 2017 he played Colonel Crael in The Inspector Jury Mysteries, a very popular German TV detective series.

In 2019 he filmed with director Ronan O'Leary on Gerard Daly's script A Sunken Place and also completed the film Calvings, written and directed by Louis Bhose. These projects await release.

Film/TV projects. 
He and a business friend option fictional material, books, short stories, with a view to develop and produce for the ever growing television market. They currently have two projects in development.

Recent recordings/narrations : Spitfire Paddy (Cowshed Media). TV documentary on the life of RAF air ace Wing Commander Brendan Finucane.

Big Week On The Farm. (RTE TV) 2017/18/19. All links.

The Colonel Who Couldn't Remember by Marc McDonald. Audiobook on Audible.

Personal life. 
Philip is married to Sandra Ellis (1/12/'90) and they have a daughter Jeanne-Marie. He lives in Glasthule, County Dublin. Hobbies include walking and meeting on Killiney Hill, France, wine ("from any region of The Roman Empire"), good conversation, politics, history and the 64 Bistro.

Politics/Quotes. 
Philip is a vocal supporter of actors and theatre folk's fast diminishing rights and work opportunities. He eagerly signed the Letter to The Minister for The Arts (2019) condemning The Abbey Theatre's current programming choices and production model. That protest process continues as a work in progress. (see Abbey Then and Now essay, in support of change at our National theatre).

On Awards. " Some covet them. Some pretend not to covet them. And then there's George C. Scott".

On Landmark. " The difference a preposition can make. In most jobs you're working for someone. But with Anne Clarke and her Landmark team, you're working with them".

On Arts "structures".  "When a precious arts resource becomes an Administrative Institution, the cream inevitably rises to the bottom. A sort of Admins Law."

On where we are. " In a civilised society, no artist should feel compelled to say yes to something for the wrong reasons. In the actor's case, desperation and or hunger..."

Filmography

Playography 
 Katie Roche (1975)

References

External links

Philip O'Sullivan at The Teresa Deevy Archive

21st-century Irish male actors
Living people
Irish male film actors
Irish male television actors
Irish male stage actors
Irish male voice actors
Place of birth missing (living people)
Year of birth missing (living people)